Sun Chan (born 1932) is a self-taught artist who is known for his unique Chinese character motifs.  Born in Lima, Peru, in 1932 to an overseas Chinese family, he was brought back to Fóshān, Guǎngdōng China to study the Chinese language at the age of five. At this time Chan first became fascinated with Chinese characters. He has always loved calligraphy and painting but was unfortunately deprived of an education after the second grade due to the break out of the Pacific War. He went through considerable hardship in the subsequent years and later moved to Hong Kong, where he worked his way from the ground up and established himself as a successful entrepreneur. 
 
As a great admirer of Chinese characters since childhood, Chan has studied the Chinese writing on his own for years. Decades ago he began making innovative artworks with Chinese characters merely to get his young daughters interested in their roots. What started out of an act of love has grown into his lifelong passion. Despite his lack of formal training in art Chan went on to explore with new visual representations for Chinese characters, and created various series of artwork throughout the years. With clean lines and vibrant colors, he transforms the Chinese script back into its pictorial form but as entirely new graphic emblems.

Chan's early works are mostly small drawings in pen and ink, color pencils, pastels and markers on paper. He constantly educates and refines himself in skills, and has switched to large-scale acrylic paintings in his more recent works. His artistic creations had been exhibited in Hong Kong, Taiwan, Singapore, and Paris, France. He is to showcase his works in New York, US in 2017, and in Zurich, Switzerland by invitation of Ernst Hohl Cultural Foundation Appenzell in 2018.

Chan's Chinese character artworks have been made into unique wall art and installed at prestigious institutions such as the Innovation Tower of the Hong Kong Polytechnic University and the International School Academy of Hong Kong, and are also adopted in large-scale public sculptures as well as fashion/lifestyle products of an international luxury brand.

Chan has long retired from his businesses and currently resides in Gold Coast, Australia, where he continues to produce original Chinese character artworks with a penchant for creativity.

Art exhibitions 

 2017: Joy to the Words – Visual Playground of Chinese Characters II, The Arts House Singapore
 2016: Au Delà Des Mots - La passion des caractères chinois - L’art de Sun Chan (Chén Shēn), China Cultural Centre, Paris, France
 2016: More Than Words – Visual Playground of Chinese Characters, The Arts House Singapore 

 2014: Back to The Picture – a Visual/Verbal Interplay of Chinese Characters, HK Visual Art Center, Hong Kong
 2013: Bi-City Biennale of Urbanism\Architecture (Hong Kong) – Beyond the Urban Edge, Kwun Tong Promenade Kowloon East Expo Site, Hong Kong
 2013: The Talking Art – Chinese Character as Image, Pier 2 Art District, Kaohsiung, Taiwan
 2012: The Talking Art – Chinese Character as Image, Wanchai Visual Archive, Hong Kong

References

Further reading
 

1932 births
Living people
Australian artists
Hong Kong artists
Peruvian artists
Chinese contemporary artists
People from Lima